Another Place is the fourth studio album released by American jazz band Hiroshima, released in 1985 by Epic Records. The album was notably the first gold record released by the band and was on the Billboard jazz chart for over a year.

Reception

Billboard referred the album as an "interesting, though rather lightweight, brand of pop/fusion." Meanwhile, Allmusic rated the album two stars out of five.

Track listing

Album Cover
The photograph on the album cover depicts a beach with two pegs stuck in the sand and wire wrapped around them. It was taken by John Pfahl in 1975 and is titled "Triangle, Bermuda."

Charts

Weekly charts

Year-end charts

References

1985 albums
Epic Records albums
Jazz-funk albums
Smooth jazz albums
Synth-pop albums by American artists